Agabus didymus is a species of beetles belonging to the family Dytiscidae.

Description
The head is black. The pronotum is dark with reddish lateral margins and base. Elytrae have three rows of punctures and characteristic lateral and subapical translucent cream N-shaped marks.

Distribution
This species is present in most of Europe, in the Near East and in North Africa.

References

External links

 Agabus didymus - Biodiversity Heritage Library - Bibliografia
 Agabus didymus - NCBI Taxonomy Database
 Agabus didymus - Global Biodiversity Information Facility
 Agabus didymus - Encyclopedia of Life

didymus
Beetles described in 1795
Beetles of Europe
Beetles of North Africa